Sidi Bel Abbès Airport , is an airport located  southeast of Sidi Bel Abbès, Algeria.

References

External links 

OurAirports - Sidi Bel Abbès

Airports in Algeria
Buildings and structures in Sidi Bel Abbès Province